Glenea aluensis is a species of beetle in the family Cerambycidae. It was described by Charles Joseph Gahan in 1897.

Subspecies
 Glenea aluensis aluensis Gahan, 1897
 Glenea aluensis vivesi Breuning, 1978

References

aluensis
Beetles described in 1897